Nematoplus is a genus of false longhorn beetles in the family Stenotrachelidae. There are at least three described species in Nematoplus.

Species
These three species belong to the genus Nematoplus:
 Nematoplus collaris LeConte, 1855
 Nematoplus konoi
 Nematoplus yamato

References

Further reading

 

Tenebrionoidea
Articles created by Qbugbot